Edundja Junior Secondary School is a school in the Ohangwena Region of northern Namibia. It is currently a junior secondary school, but it will become a full secondary school in a few years. There are about 250 students that attend Edundja. There 9 classes, ranging from grade 8 to grade 10.

History

Edundja Secondary School opened in 1989. The school had only one building at that time, and every year another building was added. Due to the quick expansion rate, the school is on its way to becoming a full-fledged secondary school consisting of grades 8–12.

The Norwegian Embassy in Namibia donated 25 computers to the school in 1999. That same year, on August 28th, President Sam Nujoma officially opened Edundja Secondary School. The US Defense Department provided funds to expand the school in 2000.

See also
 Education in Namibia
 List of schools in Namibia

References

https://web.archive.org/web/20120406181225/http://www.schoolnet.na/projects/DVAC/Edundja/Main.html

Educational institutions established in 1998
Schools in Ohangwena Region
1998 establishments in Namibia